Pamela Ferris (born 11 May 1948) is a Welsh actress. She has starred in numerous British television series, including Connie (1985), The Darling Buds of May (1991–1993), Where the Heart Is (1997–2000), Rosemary & Thyme (2003–2006), and Call the Midwife (2012–2016). For her role as Peggy Snow in Where the Heart Is she was nominated three times for Most Popular Actress at the National Television Awards.

In film, Ferris played Miss Agatha Trunchbull in Matilda (1996), Aunt Marge in Harry Potter and the Prisoner of Azkaban (2004), Miriam in Children of Men (2006), Mrs. Bevan in Nativity! (2009), voiced Mrs. Bennett / Aunty Betty in Ethel & Ernest (2016) and played Mrs. Faulkner in Tolkien (2019).

In theatre, her performance as Phoebe Rice in The Entertainer at The Old Vic in London saw her nominated for the 2007 Laurence Olivier Award for Best Performance in a Supporting Role.

Early life
Ferris was born on 11 May 1948 in Hanover, Lower Saxony, Germany, to Welsh parents, while her father was serving in the Royal Air Force. After her parents returned to the United Kingdom, Ferris spent her childhood in the Aberkenfig area, near Bridgend in Wales. Her father, Fred Ferris, was a policeman, and her mother, Ann Perkins, worked in her family's bakery business.

Career
Ferris performed in her younger years at the Mercury Theatre in Auckland, and later with various regional companies in the UK. She played motherly Ma Larkin in the ITV series The Darling Buds of May, which ran from 1991 to 1993. She was the subject of This Is Your Life in 1991, when she was surprised by Michael Aspel while recording an episode of The Darling Buds of May at Yorkshire Television in Leeds. She has also acted in a succession of television dramas, including Meantime, in which she played the Cockney mother of Phil Daniels and Tim Roth, Connie, Hardwicke House, Oranges Are Not the Only Fruit, Where the Heart Is, and Paradise Heights. From 2003 to 2006, she played the gardening sleuth, Laura Thyme, in Rosemary & Thyme, starring opposite Felicity Kendal.

Her roles in costume dramas include parts in television adaptations of Middlemarch, The Tenant of Wildfell Hall, Our Mutual Friend, The Turn of the Screw, Pollyanna, and Jane Eyre.
In 1996, Ferris portrayed the brutish, authoritarian school headmistress Miss Agatha Trunchbull in Matilda (a role played by male actors in the Broadway musical version). 

In 2004, she played the callous Aunt Marge in Harry Potter and the Prisoner of Azkaban. In 2006, Ferris took on the role of Miriam, a motherly British activist in Children of Men. She voiced Mrs. Bennett/Aunty Betty in the animated biographical film Ethel & Ernest which was broadcast on BBC One on 26 December 2016, and played Mrs. Faulkner in Tolkien (2019). She has also acted in productions for BBC Radio 4.

Her career in the theatre has included parts in Royal Court Theatre and National Theatre productions. In 2007, she played Phoebe Rice in a revival of John Osborne's The Entertainer at London's Old Vic Theatre. In 2007, Ferris took part in the BBC Wales programme Coming Home about her Welsh family history. In 2008, she played Mrs. General in a BBC adaptation of the Charles Dickens novel Little Dorrit. From 2009 to 2010, she appeared in the final series of the BBC comedy Gavin & Stacey as Cath Smith. In 2010, she made a guest appearance in the sitcom Grandma's House. From 2012 to 2016, Ferris played the part of Sister Evangelina in the series Call the Midwife. In June and July 2015, Ferris was the guest of Sarah Walker on BBC Radio 3's Essential Classics.

Personal life
In 1986, she married actor Roger Frost. She lives in Elham, Kent, England. In a 2012 interview with The Guardian Ferris said, "I was obsessed with work in my youth. It's why I didn't get married until I was 38 and the reason I didn't have kids. Not having children isn't a sadness in my life, though. I know I wouldn't have been a half-bad mother, but that's what happened. There's no regretting it."

Filmography

Film

Television

Theatre

Awards and nominations

References

External links

1948 births
Living people
20th-century British actresses
21st-century British actresses
British film actresses
British people of Welsh descent
British radio actresses
British stage actresses
British television actresses
British voice actresses
People from Bridgend County Borough
People from Elham, Kent